Lepanthopsis, abbreviated as Lpths in horticultural trade, is a genus of orchids with about 43 currently known species. They are distributed mostly in the Andes and the Caribbean, with some species in Central America, southern Mexico and Florida. Lepanthopsis orchids are very small, often with flowers measuring less than 1 centimeter across.

Species
Species accepted as of June 2014:

Lepanthopsis abbreviata Luer & Hirtz
Lepanthopsis acetabulum Luer
Lepanthopsis acuminata Ames
Lepanthopsis anthoctenium (Rchb.f.) Ames
Lepanthopsis apoda (Garay & Dunst.) Luer
Lepanthopsis aristata Dod
Lepanthopsis astrophora (Rchb.f. ex Kraenzl.) Garay
Lepanthopsis atrosetifera Dod
Lepanthopsis barahonensis (Cogn.) Garay
Lepanthopsis calva Dod ex Luer
Lepanthopsis comet-halleyi Luer
Lepanthopsis constanzensis (Cogn.) Garay
Lepanthopsis cucullata Dod
Lepanthopsis culiculosa Luer
Lepanthopsis densiflora (Barb.Rodr.) Ames
Lepanthopsis dewildei Luer & R.Escobar
Lepanthopsis dodii Garay
Lepanthopsis farrago (Luer & Hirtz) Luer
Lepanthopsis floripecten (Rchb.f.) Ames
Lepanthopsis glandulifera Dod
Lepanthopsis hirtzii Luer
Lepanthopsis hotteana (Mansf.) Garay
Lepanthopsis lingulata Dod
Lepanthopsis melanantha (Rchb.f.) Ames
Lepanthopsis micheliae Dod
Lepanthopsis microlepanthes (Griseb.) Ames
Lepanthopsis moniliformis Dod
Lepanthopsis obliquipetala (Ames & C.Schweinf.) Luer
Lepanthopsis ornipteridion Dod
Lepanthopsis peniculus (Schltr.) Garay
Lepanthopsis pristis Luer & R.Escobar
Lepanthopsis prolifera Garay
Lepanthopsis pulchella Garay & Dunst.
Lepanthopsis purpurata Dod ex Luer
Lepanthopsis pygmaea C.Schweinf.
Lepanthopsis rinkei Luer
Lepanthopsis serrulata (Cogn.) Hespenh. & Garay
Lepanthopsis stellaris Dod
Lepanthopsis steyermarkii Foldats
Lepanthopsis ubangii Luer
Lepanthopsis vellozicola R.C.Mota, F.Barros & Stehmann
Lepanthopsis vinacea C.Schweinf.
Lepanthopsis woodsiana Dod ex Luer

References

External links 

Pleurothallidinae genera
Pleurothallidinae
Taxa named by Alfred Cogniaux